Mats Lennart Ahlgren (born 19 June 1967) is a Swedish fencer. He competed in the team épée events at the 1992 Summer Olympics.

References

External links
 

1967 births
Living people
Swedish male épée fencers
Olympic fencers of Sweden
Fencers at the 1992 Summer Olympics
Sportspeople from Malmö
20th-century Swedish people